Velký Vřešťov is a market town in Trutnov District in the Hradec Králové Region of the Czech Republic. It has about 200 inhabitants.

References

External links

Villages in Trutnov District